Ralph Perrazzo is an Italian American chef. 

His restaurant, bBd's (Beers, Burgers, Desserts) was the New York City Wine & Food Festival's 2015 Burger Bash Winner and was included in Newsday's Top Long Island Restaurants in 2014, 2015 and 2016. 

He cooked at the Life Is Beautiful Music & Art Festival official kick-off party, Grills & Guitars in 2016 where he was noticed for his pickle fries and steamed burgers. Perrazzo has also been recognized for his ramen. In 2016,   George Kao of the ramen-noodle company Sun Noodle, came to bBd's in New York to try his bowl of ramen.

In 2020, Perrazzo started focusing on his new artisan line of hot dogs and his hot dog company, Snap-O-Razzo Hot Dogs.

Biography
Ralph Perrazzo grew up in Long Island, New York. At 14, he worked at Country House in Stony Brook, New York for six years before starting his education at The Culinary Institute of America. He externed at Michelin-star restaurant Jean-Georges in New York City and, after graduating, worked there for 4 years under Gabriel Kreuther and Eric Hubert.

He then worked at Nick & Toni's in East Hampton for two years, cooking under chef Joe Realmuto, focusing on rustic Italian cuisine. After moving to Las Vegas, he became the pastry chef at Bradley Ogden in Caesar's Palace. During his tenure, Bradley Ogden won the Best New Restaurant award by the James Beard Foundation. Perrazzo then became the corporate pastry chef at Pure Management Group for three years before taking on the position of pastry chef at Clio in Boston, Massachusetts, where he worked with Ken Oringer.

Perrazzo returned to his hometown in 2013 and opened his first restaurant, bBd's in Rocky Point on Long Island, New York where it garnered recognition as a neighborhood burger joint with a high quality craft beer selection.

In 2018, he closed bBd's in Rocky Point and opened bBd's in Palace Station hotel and casino in Las Vegas, Nevada, later becoming recognized by Las Vegas Weekly as one of Las Vegas’ Best New Restaurants and “one of the best places to eat in Vegas” by Food & Wine. 

As of 2022, Perrazzo moved bBd's to the Las Vegas Strip and is focusing on distributing his Snap-O-Razzo Hot Dogs nationwide and internationally.

During the COVID pandemic, Chef Perrazzo focused on his Snap-O-Razzo Hot Dog line, curating two types of quality lamb-cased hot dogs and four types of skinless hot dogs for commercial, retail, and e-commerce sales across the country. Playfully dubbed the “Hot Dog Santa”, Perrazzo, along with his fiancé and Dachshund, drove around town during the pandemic handing out samples for family and industry friends to try in exchange for honest feedback.

Snap-O-Razzo has expanded and is now servicing over 28 states. Two of Perrazzo’s non-cased Spinner Snaps, Juicy's Beef Wieners and Roasted Jalapeno Wieners, will be available in Kroger stores – Smith's Food and Drug, King Soopers, and City Market (US grocery store chain) – in Arizona, Colorado, Idaho, Montana, New Mexico, Nevada, Utah, and Wyoming in January 2023. His dogs are also sold in stadiums including Allegiant Stadium in Las Vegas and Snapdragon Stadium in San Diego, and multiple venues all over the United States.

Perrazzo is revealing a mini hot dog kit and launching a sugar-free collagen cased hot dog, the first-ever cased hot dog you can cook on a roller grill.

He also crafted his own robust hot dog sauce that pays homage to the beloved old-school New York onion sauce originally created by Alan Geisler. Perrazzo’s version proudly stays true to the original flavor profile of the red onion sauce when first created.

Crispy, cold-cured garlic and onion baby dill pickles are also on his roster of simple foods, along with a special blend of hot dog seasoning, and a coarse blend to add to simmering water.

Restaurants & Brands
 bBd's – Beers Burgers Desserts in Palace Station Casino, Las Vegas, NV
 bBd's – Beers Burgers Desserts in Rocky Point, NY
 Snap-O-Razzo Hot Dogs
 Snap-O-Razzo Hot Dogs Spinner Snaps

Awards
 2004: Bradley Ogden at Caesars Palace received “Best New Restaurant” award by the James Beard Foundation during Ralph Perrazzo's tenure
 2005: StarChefs.com Las Vegas Rising Star Pastry Chef
 2017: The Best Gastropubs on Long Island
 2018: Best New Las Vegas Restaurants by Thrillist
 2018: Las Vegas’ Best New Restaurants by Las Vegas Weekly
 2019: Gold Best Ramen by Best of Las Vegas, Las Vegas Review-Journal
 2019 :Best of Vegas – Best Eclectic Beer Menu
 2019: USA Today 5 Best – Best Restaurants in Las Vegas
 2020: “The 52 Essential Restaurants” in Eating Las Vegas by John Curtas

References

External links
 Snap-O-Razzo | Beef & Pork Hot Dogs - Linked & Maple Wood Smoked
 Craftsmanship You Can Taste | bBd’s | Beers, Burgers, Desserts 

Italian chefs

Year of birth missing (living people)
Living people